Joao Micael Villanueva Constancia (born December 22, 1996) is a Filipino actor, singer, and dancer. Constancia is known for his roles in Four Sisters Before the Wedding (2020) and He's Into Her (2021), both produced by Star Cinema. His other notable credits include appearances in Ngayon at Kailanman (2018), Maalaala Mo Kaya (2021), and the lead role in My Lockdown Romance (2020), alongside Jameson Blake.

Apart from his acting career, Constancia is also known as a member of the boyband group BoybandPH.

Early life 
Constancia was born and raised in Macau, China to Filipino parents. He is the eldest among three siblings.

In an interview published in StarStudio Magazine, Constancia stated that despite having lived in Macau, he is still Filipino at heart and determined to pursue his dream of becoming an actor in Philippine entertainment. In a separate interview Constancia stated that his dream of becoming an actor was inspired by watching Pinoy Big Brother, particularly the eighth season featuring James Reid. As a result he auditioned for the show as well as Pinoy Boyband Superstar, which were holding auditions at the same time. His auditions for the former show were unsuccessful, but he received a callback for Pinoy Boyband Superstar.

Career 
In September 2016, Constancia auditioned for ABS-CBN's Philippine reality boyband search, Pinoy Boyband Superstar. Later in the same year he emerged as one of the winners along with four other aspirants Niel Murillo, Russell Reyes, Tristan Ramirez and Ford Valencia, to form BoybandPH. In February 2017 they released their debut self-titled album under Star Music.

Subsequent to BoyBandPH, Constancia pursued his acting career. He was part of the main ensemble cast in the 2018 ABS-CBN teleserye Ngayon at Kailanman, appearing as Dominic. The following year, Constancia made his film debut, with a small part in Mae Cruz-Alviar's film Unbreakable (2019) as Bea Alonzo's brother. The film was Constancia's second collaboration with director Cruz-Alviar, with whom he had worked in Ngayon at Kailanman.

In 2020, Constancia was cast as Chad Quinto (originally played by Bernard Palanca), one of the three main male characters, and the love interest of Bobbie Salazar (played by Alexa Ilacad) in Four Sisters Before the Wedding, also directed by Cruz-Alviar. The film, a prequel to the hit 2013 film Four Sisters and a Wedding, received a limited theatrical run despite the COVID-19 pandemic. In the same year, Constancia had his first lead role in a film, appearing opposite Jameson Blake in My Lockdown Romance.

In March 2021, Constancia played the role of visually impaired Petrus in Maalaala Mo Kaya, the Philippines' longest-running drama anthology series. His first lead role in a television series, Constancia's performance was well received, with one commentator noting his "outstanding acting talent." In preparation for the role Constancia consulted YouTube videos of people with disabilities, and modelled his performance on Al Pacino's in Scent of a Woman.

Later in the year, Constancia starred as Lee Roi Gozon, one of the Alpha 3, in the ensemble series He's Into Her (2021). The show, based on the popular Wattpad novel, premiered to record-breaking viewership. In the series, which features many of ABS-CBN's younger actors, Constancia was paired as part of a love team with actress Criza Taa.

Filmography

Film

Television

Discography

Studio albums

Singles

References

External links 
 
 
 

Filipino male film actors
Filipino male television actors
21st-century Filipino male actors
21st-century Filipino male singers
Filipino male models
Filipino male dancers
Macau people of Filipino descent
ABS-CBN personalities
Star Magic
Star Music artists
1996 births
Living people